Michael Joseph Dumont is a retired American flag officer, naval aviator and vice admiral in the United States Navy who last served as deputy commander of U.S. Northern Command and Vice Commander, U.S. Element, North American Aerospace Defense Command at Peterson Air Force Base, Colorado. Mike served in the US Army for five years as an aviator and paratrooper and later, he joined the US Navy.

In 2017 or earlier, Mike served as a vice director of Joint Chiefs of Staff at Pentagon upon his promotion to the rank of two-star rear admiral.

Education
Dumont attended Brunswick High School, graduating in 1978. He received a Bachelor of Arts from the University of Southern Maine. Dumont also attended Suffolk University Law School where he completed further studies and earned a Juris Doctor degree. He attended United States Army War College and gained a Master of Science in strategic studies and later attended the National War College, gaining a master's degree in National Security Strategy.

Career
Dumont was born in Brunswick, Maine, and was commissioned in the United States Army as a second lieutenant. Before joining the Navy, he served five years as an army aviator and paratrooper, and later established his career associations with the US Navy as a naval aviator. At the joint command level, he was assigned to command operational units, including a squadron. He was later appointed as a special assistant to the Supreme Allied Commander Europe and Commander of United States European Command. Dumont served as chief of staff, and defense representative to Pakistan and deputy chief of staff for stability and support operations. Later, he was assigned to joint command the NATO-led International Security Assistance Force in Afghanistan and chief of staff and deputy chief of staff for strategy, resources and plans. Besides serving at a naval component command United States Naval Forces Europe – Naval Forces Africa, he was also appointed deputy director for Political-Military Affairs. His prominent assignments include deputy director for strategic initiatives and later, vice director.

After serving at various posts, rear admiral Dumont was later nominated for the appointment of vice admiral rank and was subsequently appointed as the deputy commander for U.S. Northern Command and Vice Commander, U.S. Element, North American Aerospace Defense Command at Peterson Air Force Base, Colorado.

Awards and decorations

References

Year of birth missing (living people)
Living people
People from Brunswick, Maine
Brunswick High School (Maine) alumni
University of Southern Maine alumni
United States Army officers
Military personnel from Maine
United States Army aviators
Aviators from Maine
United States Naval Aviators
Suffolk University Law School alumni
Maine lawyers
United States Army War College alumni
National War College alumni
Recipients of the Legion of Merit
United States Navy vice admirals
Recipients of the Defense Superior Service Medal
Recipients of the Defense Distinguished Service Medal